Chandana Aravinda (born 11 November 1982) is a Sri Lankan cricketer. He has played 32 first-class and 36 List A matches for several domestic sides in Sri Lanka since 2002/03. His last first-class match was for Colts Cricket Club in the 2012–13 Premier Trophy on 22 March 2013.

See also
 List of Chilaw Marians Cricket Club players

References

External links
 

1982 births
Living people
Sri Lankan cricketers
Burgher Recreation Club cricketers
Chilaw Marians Cricket Club cricketers
Colts Cricket Club cricketers
Panadura Sports Club cricketers